Anderson is a city and county seat of Grimes County, Texas, United States. The population was 193 as of the 2020 census. The town and its surroundings are listed on the National Register of Historic Places as the Anderson Historic District.

The town is named for Kenneth Lewis Anderson, a vice-president of the Republic of Texas, who died here at the Fanthorp Inn in 1845.

Geography

Texas State Highway 90 passes through the city, leading north  to Roans Prairie and southwest  to Navasota, the largest city in Grimes County.

Climate

The climate in this area is characterized by hot, humid summers and generally mild to cool winters.  According to the Köppen Climate Classification system, Anderson has a humid subtropical climate, abbreviated "Cfa" on climate maps.

Demographics

As of the 2020 United States census, there were 193 people, 85 households, and 58 families residing in the city.

As of the census of 2000, there were 257 people, 92 households, and 59 families residing in the city. The population density was 498.6 people per square mile (190.8/km2). There were 119 housing units at an average density of 230.8 per square mile (88.4/km2). The racial makeup of the city was 54.86% White, 40.47% African American, 0.78% Native American, 2.72% from other races, and 1.17% from two or more races. Hispanic or Latino of any race were 4.67% of the population.

There were 92 households, out of which 21.7% had children under the age of 18 living with them, 46.7% were married couples living together, 14.1% had a female householder with no husband present, and 34.8% were non-families. 32.6% of all households were made up of individuals, and 17.4% had someone living alone who was 65 years of age or older. The average household size was 2.35 and the average family size was 2.95.

In the city, the population was spread out, with 17.9% under the age of 18, 7.8% from 18 to 24, 30.7% from 25 to 44, 29.6% from 45 to 64, and 14.0% who were 65 years of age or older. The median age was 42 years. For every 100 females, there were 112.4 males. For every 100 females age 18 and over, there were 129.3 males.

The median income for a household in the city was $33,409, and the median income for a family was $34,375. Males had a median income of $24,135 versus $22,188 for females. The per capita income for the city was $14,718. About 8.3% of families and 11.0% of the population were below the poverty line, including 9.1% of those under the age of eighteen and 21.1% of those 65 or over.

Government
John S. Freeman served as mayor of Anderson from 1995 to 2004. Gail Sowell has served as mayor from 2004 until 2019. Karen McDuffie has served as Mayor from 2019 until present.

Education
Public education in the city of Anderson is provided by the Anderson-Shiro Consolidated Independent School District.

History
Long occupied by indigenous peoples, this area was initially settled by Europeans and creole Spanish during Spanish colonial rule. Anglo-Americans began to enter the area in the 1820s from the Southern United States. After Mexico achieved independence, it accepted additional settlers from the United States into eastern Texas. It allowed them to practice their own religion, if they swore loyalty to Mexico. A few structures in town date from this period.

Texas achieved independence in 1836 and settlers continued to arrive from the United States. As they came mostly from the South and brought slaves with them, Grimes and other eastern counties had the highest proportion of slaveholders and slaves in the republic.

Grimes County was organized in 1846, soon after the Republic of Texas was annexed by the United States. Henry Fanthorp, a new Anglo-American settler in Texas, offered land for the county seat. The town grew quickly between 1846 and 1885, reaching a peak population of about 3,000 people. County population was majority-black and enslaved by 1860. The black majority continued until many African Americans left during the 20th century in the Great Migration, to leave behind Jim Crow conditions.

Anderson in 1859 rejected being connected to the Texas and Central Railroad, and was soon surpassed in population and economic growth by Navasota, Texas. Anderson could not catch up again, although it accepted a railroad in 1903. The town was incorporated, but records show elected officials only for the years 1867 and 1875.

In 1983 a movement to revive city government was defeated at the polls. In 1995, the town began having major sewer problems and the state threatened to shut down the county courthouse if the problems were not fixed. One solution was to incorporate the town again so that it would be eligible for grants to acquire a sewer system. In 1995, John Freeman was elected as the first mayor, and the town was incorporated in 1998. He retired in 2003 and Gail Sowell was elected as mayor.

Anderson Historic District

The entire town and surrounding areas has been recognized as the Anderson Historic District, which was listed on the National Register of Historic Places (NRHP) in 1974. The area was originally settled during Spanish colonial rule. The town is unusual in that a large number of structures have survived that reflect the history of Texas from the Mexican period through the years of the Republic of Texas and into early statehood. Anderson has never fully recovered from economic decline suffered during the late nineteenth century. As a result, the town's appearance has been largely unchanged since the beginning of the twentieth century.

Notable buildings within the district, either due to being specifically named as more important structures that typify Anderson on the district's NRHP nomination form or to their inclusion on the state's heritage registries, State Antiquities Landmarks (SALs) or Recorded Texas Historic Landmarks (RTHLs), include the following:

Allen Home (RTHL #14266, 1965), 440 Fanthorp St. – This Greek Revival house was built around 1840 and first served as a girls' academy, the Miss Sally Thompson School Building (RTHL #8622, 1965).

Anderson Baptist Church (RTHL #8562, 1965), 379 S. Main St. – The Greek Revival church was built between 1853 and 1855 from native stone by enslaved African-American laborers and artisans. The church features three entrance doors with a larger, taller central doorway and evokes the style of rural Greek Revival churches in New England. The Baptist General Convention of Texas was organized here in 1848. After a 1955 fire, the church was reconstructed using the original stone but with a replacement bell tower.

Rueben Bennett House (RTHL #14195, 1963)
H.H. Boggess House, 201 Fanthorp St. – This residence is one of three homes of porticoed, Palladian architecture in close proximity on Fanthorp Street, forming an unusual cluster. This house features a double gallery.
Fanthorp Inn State Historic Site (SAL #8200000297, 1983), 579 S. Main St. – Henry Fanthorp, who would be appointed in 1835 as postmaster of the provisional government of the Texas Republic, originally constructed this structure in 1834. It was a clapboard-covered cedar log house in a dogtrot-style, with random-width puncheon floors. He built it as the family home for his third wife, Rachel Kennard. They began to use the building as a hotel and mercantile structure, and it held the region's first post office. The inn grew incrementally until 1851, when a second floor and residence wing were added, bringing capacity to thirty rooms. In 1845, Vice President Kenneth Lewis Anderson of the Republic of Texas, after whom the town is named, died while staying at the inn. The Texas Parks and Wildlife Department acquired the property in 1977 and, following extensive restoration, opened the site to the public in 1987 as a demonstration of life at a stagecoach stop and family home in 1850.

B.B. Goodrich House (RTHL #8582, 1963), 335 Fanthorp St. – Benjamin Briggs Goodrich was an American medical doctor who settled in Texas in the early 1800s. He later served as a member of the Convention of 1836 and signed the Texas Declaration of Independence adopted by the convention; he also signed the new republic's constitution. The small Palladian house has a two-story, double porticoed central section, with one-story wings on each side.

The Harris-Martin House (#), 263 Fanthorp St. – John Birdsall Harris inherited the house from his cousin, Charles J. Birdsall. Harris followed his parents, John R. Harris and Jane Harris, to Texas, who preceded him to found the colony of Harrisburg, Texas (now in modern Houston). In 1877 John R. Martin, Jr bought the home and made substantial changes to the structure. Martin, son of John R. Martin, a Texas Ranger and member of the Texian Army. John R. Martin, Jr. was a Confederate soldier and served as Treasurer for Grimes County. The house is a simple braced-frame construction with porch on two sides. The interior consisted of two rooms. Built on two lots given to John Harris by his father-in-law Benjamin Briggs Goodrich. In 1877, John F. Martin, Jr. purchased the property and converted the home to the Greek Revival Style. Changes added a double portico central section with a narrow staircase to the left of the window on the front porch.

Grimes County Courthouse (SAL #8200000298, 1992; RTHL #8585, 1965), 100 S. Main St. – This 1891 structure is the third courthouse on a site donated by Henry Fanthorp. The Edwardian-Victorian structure is composed of hand-made red brick walls and rusticated native stone groins and entrances. Atop the building is a central wooden cupola, and the courthouse contains the same vault as its predecessors.

Steinhagen Log Cabin (RTHL #8617, 1965), 201 Houston St. – This pre-1860 cabin is made up of unspliced timbers, stones, doors, and window shutters, all crafted by enslaved African-American workers.
Vernacular Palladian House, 241 Fanthorp St. – This is another small porticoed Palladian house of Texas vernacular style.

Notable people

 Chuck Norris, actor and martial artist

See also

National Register of Historic Places listings in Grimes County, Texas
List of Texas State Historic Sites
Recorded Texas Historic Landmarks in Grimes County

References

External links

Cities in Texas
Cities in Grimes County, Texas
County seats in Texas
National Register of Historic Places in Grimes County, Texas
Historic districts on the National Register of Historic Places in Texas